Yibada (Chinese: 易八達;) is a Global Chinese online media company for Chinese communities around the world. Yibada operates 35 cities' editions, including New York City, San Francisco, Los Angeles, Chicago, Hongkong, Beijing, Shanghai, Nigra, São Paulo, etc. The different cities' editions help facilitate easy access to local cities' news and useful information.

Launched in 2005, Yibada was created to provide news and information services to the local Chinese community. It is a privately held company and is still owned by its co-founder Winnie Wong. Its headquarters are in the Financial District of New York.

History 
The company was first conceived in San Francisco, California, by Winnie Wong, a Chinese native born in Hong Kong, who came up with the idea for global Chinese community news and practical information. She found that the international Chinese around the world needed more news and local information. Online media could be a better platform.
The site went live in 2005, and formally incorporated the company in March 2006 as Yibada in California. The website has the large circulation among Chinese and Chinese American, and it grows quickly and has expanded to a national Network. In the last 8 years, Yibada has covered 35 cities around the world, including 17 cities in North America, 5 cities in China, and 13 cities in other regions, like Europe, South America, Middle East and Africa.

Feature 
Yibada features news, classified information, and custom content yellow pages. It has since expanded to include other specialized sections, Travel, Food, Fashion, Wedding, Health, Education, TV, Game, and Forum. Yibada provides Internet services to the local Chinese population. In every localized city edition, there are breaking News, practical classified information and specialized Travel, Food, Fashion, Wedding, Health, Education, TV, Game, and Forum sections.

Yibada developed the local custom yellow pages product to provide the best practical information to the local Chinese; the content includes the detail business introduction, using custom photos, videos to display the local business information. Yibada also set up the practical classified information and specialized sections to help the local Chinese get more useful information from the Internet. Yibada also share and spread local information via the popular social media, such as Facebook, Twitter, Sina Weibo and Forum with a large number of fans from these media. Yibada Forum and Weibo provide a free and large platform for more Chinese around the world to share the fastest and useful information and communicate with each other.

References

External links 
 
 Yibada.com Traffic, Demographics and Competitors - Alexa 
 Yibada Facebook
 Sina Visitor System, Yibada Weibo

Information technology companies of China
Online mass media companies